Aleksandar Radosavljević (born 25 April 1979) is a Slovenian football coach and a former midfielder. He is the manager of the Slovenia national under-16 team.

Radosavljević was a member of the Slovenia national team, and represented the nation at the 2010 FIFA World Cup.

Club career
In August 2010, Radosavljević was signed by Dutch Eredivisie team ADO Den Haag. In summer 2011, he signed a contract until the 2012–13 season. He was loaned to VVV-Venlo, and released after the 2012–13 season.

Career statistics

International 
Scores and results list Slovenia's goal tally first, score column indicates score after each Radosavljević goal.

See also
Slovenian international players

References

External links

Player profile at NZS 

1979 births
Living people
Sportspeople from Kranj
Slovenian footballers
Association football utility players
Slovenia youth international footballers
Slovenia under-21 international footballers
Slovenia international footballers
Association football midfielders
Association football fullbacks
Association football central defenders
Association football sweepers
NK Triglav Kranj players
NK Celje players
FC Shinnik Yaroslavl players
NK Mura players
FC Tom Tomsk players
Athlitiki Enosi Larissa F.C. players
ADO Den Haag players
VVV-Venlo players
NK Olimpija Ljubljana (2005) players
Slovenian PrvaLiga players
Russian Premier League players
Super League Greece players
Eredivisie players
Slovenian expatriate footballers
Slovenian expatriate sportspeople in Russia
Expatriate footballers in Russia
Slovenian expatriate sportspeople in Greece
Expatriate footballers in Greece
Slovenian expatriate sportspeople in the Netherlands
Expatriate footballers in the Netherlands
2010 FIFA World Cup players
Slovenian football managers